The Großer Wurzelnberg rises to a height of  in the Harz mountains of central Germany. It lies 3.7 km northeast of Sieber in the district of Göttingen in Lower Saxony. It is a rounded summit (Kuppe) on one of the ridges running southwards from the Acker and which forms the watershed between the Kleine Kulmke and the Große Kulmke. The Kleiner Wurzelnberg is located 750 m further west on the other side of the valley of the Kleine Kulmke.

Sources 
Topographische Karte 1:25000, No. 4228 Riefensbeek

Mountains of Lower Saxony
Mountains of the Harz
Mountains under 1000 metres
Göttingen (district)